Calosoma deckeni is a species of ground beetle in the subfamily of Carabinae. It was described by Gersteacker.

References

deckeni